Andrew Gay (born 5 October 1989) is a Welsh international rugby league footballer who played semi-professionally for South Wales and represented the Welsh national team, most notably at the 2011 Four Nations and the 2017 World Cup.

Background
Gay was born in Sydney and raised on the Central Coast of New South Wales, Australia. His father was born in Splott, Wales.

Playing career 

In 2012, Gay joined the Mackay Cutters in the Queensland Cup.

References

External links 
(archived by web.archive.org) Profile at scorpionsrl.com

1989 births
Living people
Australian people of Welsh descent
Australian rugby league players
Mackay Cutters players
Rugby league centres
Rugby league five-eighths
Rugby league fullbacks
Rugby league wingers
South Wales Scorpions players
Wales national rugby league team players